Chen Tao (824-882) was a poet of the late Tang dynasty, and one of whose poems was collected in the popular anthology Three Hundred Tang Poems; also, other of his poems have been anthologized in the Quantangshi (also known as, the Collected Tang Poems). The poem appearing in the Three Hundred Tang Poems is the well-known verse sometimes known as "Lung-hsi Song".

Biography
Biographical information about Chen Tao seems scarce; not only that, but, A. R. Davis mentions an "element of confusion", in this regard: and, if this is the same Chen Tao mentioned in connection with Tian Lingzi in the year 888, then either this date or the date of his death is wrong. It is known that Chen Tao was learned in Buddhism and Taoism and that he pursued the study of astronomy and alchemy, and that he spent most of his life in retirement in what is now Nanchang, in the Chinese province of Jiangxi.

Poetry
Chen Tao is best known for his one poem which is included in the Three Hundred Tang Poems ("隴西行", Longxi xing), translated as "Turkestan" by Witter Bynner.

Notes

References
Davis, A. R., ed., Robert Kotewall and Norman L. Smith, trans. The Penguin Book of Chinese Verse. Baltimore: Penguin Books (1970).
Wu, John C. H. (1972). The Four Seasons of Tang Poetry. Rutland, Vermont: Charles E.Tuttle.

External links
 

824 births
882 deaths
Three Hundred Tang Poems poets
People from Nanping
Poets from Fujian
9th-century Chinese poets